Autoimmune polyendocrine syndrome type 1 (APS-1), is a subtype of autoimmune polyendocrine syndrome (autoimmune polyglandular syndrome). It causes the dysfunction of multiple endocrine glands due to autoimmunity. It is a genetic disorder, inherited in autosomal recessive fashion due to a defect in the AIRE gene (autoimmune regulator), which is located on chromosome 21 and normally confers immune tolerance.

Signs and symptoms 
APS-1 tends to cause severe symptoms. These are present from early in life, usually around 3.5 years of age. Common symptoms of APS-1 include:
 Chronic mucocutaneous candidiasis.
 Hypoparathyroidism.
 Addison's disease.
 Ectodermal dystrophy (skin, dental enamel, and nails).

APS-1 may also cause:
 Autoimmune hepatitis.
 Hypogonadism.
 Vitiligo.
 Alopecia.
 Malabsorption.
 Pernicious anemia.
 Cataract.
 Cerebellar ataxia.

Cause 

APS-1 is caused by a mutation in the AIRE gene, encoding a protein called autoimmune regulator. This is found on the 21q22.3 chromosome location, hence chromosome 21. The AIRE gene may be affected by any of at least 90 mutations. Mutations may be inherited in an autosomal recessive manner.

Different mutations are more common in different geographic regions. R139X is a common mutation in Sardinia. R257* is a common mutation in Finland.

Pathophysiology 
APS-1 is due to problems with immune tolerance. APS-1 causes considerable reactions with both interferon omega and interferon alpha. There may also be a reaction against interleukin 22. This leads to damage to endocrine organs. Common problems include hypercalcaemia and nephrocalcinosis (due to a lack of calcitonin from the thyroid), and pituitary problems (such as growth hormone deficiency). Antibodies against NLRP5 may lead to hypoparathyroidism.

Diagnosis 

Diagnosis of APS-1 is based on a number of tests, including endoscopy, a CT scan, a biopsy (with histological testing), and serum endocrine autoantibody screening.

Treatment 
Autoimmune polyendocrine syndrome type 1 treatment is based on the symptoms that are presented by the affected individual. Treatments may involve hormone therapy, systemic antifungal treatments, and immunosuppression.

History 
APS-1 may also be known as autoimmunity endocrinopathy candidiasis ectodermal dystrophy / dysplasia (APECED), autoimmune polyglandular syndrome type 1, Whitaker syndrome, or candidiasis-hypoparathyroidism-Addison's disease syndrome.

See also 
 Autoimmune polyendocrine syndrome type 2
 IPEX syndrome
 Autoimmune polyendocrine syndrome

References

Further reading

External links 
 PubMed

Endocrine diseases
Autoimmune diseases
Transcription factor deficiencies
Syndromes